Gary Hampton was a former American football coach.  He was the 33rd head football coach at Washburn University in Topeka, Kansas serving for two seasons, from 1979 to 1980, and compiling a record of 6–14.  Hampton played college football at as a linebacker at Kansas Wesleyan University. Before being hired at Washburn, he was an assistant football and head golf coach at Idaho State University.

Head coaching record

College football

References

1948 births
1993 deaths
American football linebackers
Idaho State Bengals football coaches
Kansas Wesleyan Coyotes football players
Washburn Ichabods football coaches
College golf coaches in the United States
High school football coaches in Kansas